Karl Heinrich Mertens (Russian: Андрей Карлович Мертенс, 17 May 1796 – 18 September 1830 Kronstadt), was a German botanist and naturalist, and son of the botanist Franz Carl Mertens.

Mertens was aboard the Russian vessel Senyavin under Captain Lieutenant Fedor Petrovich Litke with orders to explore the coasts of Russian America and Asia.
This turned out to be one of the most productive voyages of discovery in the nineteenth century. Mertens, ornithologist Baron von Kittlitz, and mineralogist Alexander Postels collected and described over 1 000 new species of animal life, and some 2 500 specimens of plants, algae, and rocks. 

Shortly after this voyage, Litke and the Senyavin set out on another scientific expedition to Iceland, the chief scientist being Mertens who died two weeks after the expedition's return to Kronstadt. 

Cape Mertens (64°32’N, 172°25’W) east of the Chukotka Peninsula at the exit from the Senyavin Straits is named in his honour, as is the ctenophore genus Mertensia created by Lesson in 1830 and the family Mertensiidae by Louis Agassiz in 1860, as well as many specific names.  The plant genus Mertensia is in honour of his father.

References

1796 births
1830 deaths
German naturalists
German marine biologists